Varsity International School is an independent, private co-educational high school in Honolulu, Hawaii. The school is nonsectarian.

Enrollment
Approximately 60 students are enrolled at the school, the majority of whom are of Asian ancestry.

References

 Private School Review—Varsity International School 
 Private Schools Report—Varsity International School

Private high schools in Honolulu